Williams Unified School District 2 is a unified school district located in Williams, Arizona, a town located in Coconino County. It is composed of two schools; Williams Elementary-Middle School, and Williams High School. The mascot of Williams High School is the Viking; the mascot for the Williams-Elementary Middle School is the Falcon. The current superintendent is Mr. Eric Evans, while the principals of the two schools are Dr. Connie Hargis (for the high school), and Tammara Ragsdale (for the elementary middle school).

References

External links
 

School districts in Coconino County, Arizona
Williams, Arizona